West Wapei Rural LLG is a local-level government (LLG) of Sandaun Province, Papua New Guinea. The West Wapei languages (also called the One languages) are spoken in this LLG.

Wards
01. Kabore (One language speakers)
02. Molmo (One language speakers)
03. Pelama
04. Kakoi (One language speakers)
05. Yebil
06. Inebu (One language speakers)
07. Mokai
08. Karaitem
09. Minate
10. Sibote
11. Miwaute
12. Wabute
13. Kupuom
14. Wigote
15. Kumnate

References

Local-level governments of Sandaun Province